Empty Holsters is a 1937 American Western film directed by B. Reeves Eason and written by John T. Neville. The film stars Dick Foran, Patricia Walthall, Emmett Vogan, Glenn Strange, Anderson Lawler and Wilfred Lucas. The film was released by Warner Bros. on July 10, 1937.

Plot
In the Old West, cowhands Clay Brent and Tex Roberts work for rancher Tom Raines. Clay competes with bar owner Ace Cain for the affections of Judy Ware, who has no interest in Ace. Local banker John Ware, Judy's father, turns down Ace for a loan to buy a ranch. Tom fires Tex after Tom mistakenly becomes the brunt of a practical joke.

To get Clay out of his way, Ace and his henchmen, Cutter Smith and Buck McGovern, falsely accuse Clay of a stagecoach holdup. Ace kills the driver and the guard (one of whom is the sheriff's brother) and steals its cargo of gold coins. Cutter and Buck report Clay is responsible for the murder and robbery. Clay is convicted and sentenced to 10 years in state prison. A model prisoner, Clay is paroled after 5 years, and returns to his old job with Tom where Clay is reunited with his horse, Smokey, who had run off. Clay reports to the sheriff who seizes his guns, telling Clay "empty holsters" is a condition of his parole.

Clay's father, who runs a saddle shop, tells Clay that Ace Cain owns "just about everything" in town and Tex has now joined up with his gang. Clay notices that a saddle his father was making for Ace has a gold coin woven into the leather that matches the gold coins stolen from the stage robbery. Clay goes to Judy's house where he overhears an argument between Ace and Judy in which Ace threatens Judy and her father.  Clay intervenes and a fight ensues. Clay kicks Ace out of the house, but Ace learns of Clay's discovery of the stolen coins.

Ace returns to his office and instructs Cutter to ambush Clay. During a skirmish, Smokey attacks Cutter, who injures his arm. Ace falsely tells the sheriff that Clay provoked the fight with Cutter and that the coins in Mr. Brent's possession are evidence of Mr. Brent's complicity in the robbery.  The gang contacts U.S. Marshal Billy O'Neill and falsely accuse Clay.  O'Neill arrests Clay for violating his parole. Tex arrives, knocks O'Neill unconscious and frees Clay, explaining that although he is in Ace's gang, he no longer follows him.

Clay visits Cutter at the doctor's office and leverages Cutter's injury to force him into confessing that  Ace committed both murders and the robbery of the gold coins. The sheriff musters a posse to find Clay. While the sheriff is away, Ace plans to steal all the money in town and skip out.  Tex reports the plan to Clay who hurries to John Ware's bank. The sheriff goes to Tom's ranch searching for Clay and Tex. Tex arrives and explains to the sheriff that Clay is innocent. The sheriff's posse and Tom's hands ride off with Tex to find Ace. Ace and his gang begin their assault, starting with John Ware's bank, where Judy and her father are hiding Clay. Clay breaks cover and a gunfight ensues inside the bank. The posse arrives to subdue Ace and his men. The sheriff tells Clay he can have his guns back. Clay and Judy ride off as Clay sings "The Prairie Is My Home."

Cast  
 Dick Foran as Clay Brent 
 Patricia Walthall as Judy Ware
 Emmett Vogan as Ace Cain
 Glenn Strange as Tex Roberts (billed as Glen Strange)
 Anderson Lawler as Buck McGovern 
 Wilfred Lucas as John Ware
 Tom Brower as Dad Brent
 George Chesebro as Cutter Smith 
 Charles Le Moyne as Tom Raines 
 Edmund Cobb as Sheriff Cal Hardin
 J. P. McGowan as U.S. Marshal Billy O'Neill
 Milton Kibbee as Jim Hall 
 Earl Dwire as Dr. J.M. 'Doc' Eagan
 Henry Otho as Charlie

References

External links 
 
 
 
 

1937 films
American Western (genre) films
1937 Western (genre) films
Warner Bros. films
Films directed by B. Reeves Eason
American black-and-white films
1930s English-language films
1930s American films